The 1959 PGA Tour season was played from January 2 to December 6. The season consisted of 46 official money events. Gene Littler won the most tournaments with five. Art Wall Jr. was the leading money winner with earnings of $53,168. Wall was voted the PGA Player of the Year after four wins including the Masters, and won the Vardon Trophy for the lowest scoring average.

Schedule
The following table lists official events during the 1959 season.

Unofficial events
The following events were sanctioned by the PGA Tour, but did not carry official money, nor were wins official.

Awards

Notes

References

External links
PGA Tour official site

PGA Tour seasons
PGA Tour